Benedict L. Sliney (born 1945) is an American retired lawyer, air traffic controller, and former Federal Aviation Administration (FAA) National Operations Manager. His first day in this position was on September 11, 2001, and he was responsible for ordering a National Ground Stop across United States airspace in response to the September 11 attacks.

Actions on September 11, 2001 
After two planes crashed into the twin towers of the World Trade Center and another into the Pentagon, Sliney gave the order to land every plane in the air over the US at the time (implementing the SCATANA plan), effectively shutting down US airspace. There were roughly 4,200 aircraft in flight. This was an unprecedented act, which the 9/11 Commission later denoted as an important and decisive moment in that morning's chaos. While Sliney made the decision on his own initiative, he had the advice of an experienced staff of air traffic controllers and traffic managers.

Although it was his first day in charge, Sliney had an over-25-year background in air traffic and management in the FAA. He had held various positions as an air traffic controller, first-line supervisor at several major facilities, and Operations Manager and Traffic Management Officer at New York TRACON. He also held positions as Traffic Management Specialist, National Operations Manager, and Tactical Operations Manager at the Air Traffic Control System Command Center (ATCSCC) and had regional office experience as Manager, Airspace and Procedures Branch, Eastern Region.

Sliney later left the FAA to practice law.

Personal life 
Sliney is married to Irene Lynch Ahern. , he is retired and lives in Sandwich, Massachusetts.

Portrayals in films and television 
Sliney was initially involved in the 2006 film United 93 in an advisory role. He was then cast in a small role as an air traffic controller. Later, the film's writer and director, Paul Greengrass, offered him the opportunity to play himself, which he accepted. Sliney also had a small role in Greengrass's 2010 film Green Zone. He also took part in the documentary Seconds from Disaster.

References

External links

1940s births
20th-century American lawyers
21st-century American lawyers
21st-century American male actors
Air traffic control in the United States
Air traffic controllers
American lawyers
American male film actors
Dowling College alumni
Federal Aviation Administration personnel
Living people
People associated with the September 11 attacks
People from Sandwich, Massachusetts
St. John's University School of Law alumni